Odysseus Meladinis (born 5 April 1990) is a Greek swimmer. He competed in the men's 50 metre freestyle event and the men's 4 × 100 metre freestyle relay event at the 2016 Summer Olympics. He finished 33rd in the heats for the men's 50 m freestyle competition and did not qualify for the semifinals. The Greek men's 4 × 100 metre freestyle relay team finished 10th in the heats and did not qualify for the final.

References

External links
 

1990 births
Living people
Greek male swimmers
Olympic swimmers of Greece
Swimmers at the 2016 Summer Olympics
Place of birth missing (living people)
Mediterranean Games bronze medalists for Greece
Mediterranean Games medalists in swimming
PAOK swimmers
Swimmers at the 2013 Mediterranean Games
Greek male freestyle swimmers
Swimmers at the 2020 Summer Olympics